"Summertime Magic" is a song by the American recording artist Childish Gambino. Written and produced by Gambino and Ludwig Göransson, the song was released by Wolf+Rothstein and RCA Records on July 11, 2018. The song was speculated to be the lead single from Gambino's then-upcoming fourth studio album, but was eventually not included. It was made available for digital download and streaming with "Feels Like Summer" as an extended play under the title Summer Pack.

Personnel
Credits adapted from Tidal.
 Childish Gambino – production, mix engineering
 Ludwig Göransson – production
 Riley Temple – mix engineering, master engineering, record engineering
 Kesha "K.Lee" Lee – record engineering

Charts

Weekly charts

Year-end charts

Certifications

Release history

References

External links

2018 singles
2018 songs
Donald Glover songs
RCA Records singles
Songs written by Donald Glover
Songs written by Ludwig Göransson